Louis Marinus Meeuwessen (14 November 1903 – 8 August 1985) was a Dutch boxer who competed in the 1924 Summer Olympics. He was born in Rotterdam and died in Amsterdam. In 1924 he was eliminated in the first round of the middleweight class after losing his fight to Øivind Jensen.

References

External links
 

1903 births
1985 deaths
Middleweight boxers
Olympic boxers of the Netherlands
Boxers at the 1924 Summer Olympics
Boxers from Rotterdam
Dutch male boxers